The Cassiopea class is a heavy series of four patrol boats of the Italian Navy. They were built in the late 1980s on civilian standards. They are designed for patrol in safe areas.

Development and design 
In the early 1980s the Italian navy developed two classes of corvettes to replace older vessels. The  were fully combatant ships to serve as coastal escorts, and equipped with modern sensors and armament, while the Cassiopea class were simpler offshore patrol vessels intended to replace the old s used for fisheries patrol.

Construction of four ships (out of eight originally planned) was authorized in December 1982, with funding from the Ministry of Merchant Marine. Orders were placed in December 1986, with construction starting the next year at Fincantieri shipyard, Muggiano. The ships were built to mercantile standards, and the first ship entered service in 1989. A further two ships were cancelled in 1991, prior to the start of construction.

The ships' main gun armament is a single 76mm/L62 Allargato gun; both gun and fire control systems came from scrapped s. Each ship is fitted with a flight deck and fixed hangar to accommodate a helicopter type Agusta-Bell AB-212 ASW of the Italian navy. Each also carries equipment for dealing with pollution.
Between 2012 and 2014 all units were fitted with Selex ES Janus-N IR optronic system.
As of 2014 the ships, starting with Libra were fitted with new dual-band navigation (X/Ka) Gemini-DB radar systems from GEM Elettronica.

Ships 
Source:

Notes

References 
 Baker, A.D. The Naval Institute Guide to Combat Fleets of the World 1998–1999. Annapolis, Maryland, USA. .
 Gardiner, Roger and Stephen Chumbley. Conway's All The World's Fighting Ships 1947–1995. Annapolis, Maryland, USA. .
 Grove, Eric J. NATO Major Warships – Europe. Tri-Service Pocketbook. London: Tri-Service Press, 1990. .

External links 

Cassiopea (P 401) Marina Militare website

Ships built by Fincantieri
Cassiopea-class patrol vessels
Patrol ship classes